Oseetah Lake is an  lake with a mean depth of . It is located mostly in the town of Harrietstown, but its easternmost portion extends into the town of North Elba.

Description
The Saranac River departs the lower locks below Lower Saranac Lake and flows northeast into Oseetah Lake.  The river exits Oseetah at the north end of the lake and flows northeast to Lake Flower and Saranac Lake.  Oseetah is also fed by Kiwassa Lake.  Principal islands in Oseetah Lake are Wayotah, Wapiti, Watch, Haven of Rest, Papoose and Birch.  Its shoreline is mostly privately held.

It is part of the route of the Adirondack Canoe Classic, also known as the Ninety-miler, along with the  Northern Forest Canoe Trail that runs from Old Forge, New York to Fort Kent, Maine.

History

According to legend, Oseetah was an Indian Princess.  Upon learning the Indian chief she loved (Wayotah) was betrothed to another, she threw herself off a cliff into a lake and was magically transformed into a water lily.  In the Huron language Oseetah means "Water Lily".

Originally named Miller Pond, Oseetah Lake was formed when the dam across the Saranac River at Saranac Lake, that also forms Lake Flower, was raised to generate electric power by the Saranac Light and Power Company in 1894 (purchased by Paul Smith in 1904).  At that time, as shown by maps of the period, a smaller pond, Ray Pond, also became part of the new, larger Oseetah - in what is now the eastern portion of the lake near the Essex County line.

References

Notes

Bibliography
 Colvin, Verplanck. "Topographical Survey, Adirondack Region". Weed Parsons & Company, 1880.
 Donaldson, Alfred Lee. "A History of the Adirondacks, Volumes 1 and 2".  The Century Co., 1921.  New York. link, v. 1 link, v. 2
 NYSDEC. "New York State Department of Environmental Conservation, Division of Fish, Wildlife and Marine Resources Lake Map Series; Region 5; Oseetah Lake"
 USGS "New York Saranac Quadrangle" (15 minute series). 1904.

External links

Reservoirs in New York (state)
Protected areas of Essex County, New York
Protected areas of Franklin County, New York
Reservoirs in Essex County, New York
Reservoirs in Franklin County, New York
Northern Forest Canoe Trail